Syntrophobacter  is a genus of bacteria from the family of Syntrophobacteraceae. Syntrophobacter have the ability to grow on propionate.

References

Further reading 
 
 
 
 
 

Thermodesulfobacteriota
Bacteria genera